The 1996 United States Senate election in Oklahoma was held on November 5, 1996. Incumbent Republican U.S. Senator Jim Inhofe, first elected in a 1994 special election, won re-election to his first full term.

Republican primary

Candidates 
 Jim Inhofe, incumbent U.S. Senator
 Dan Lowe

Results

Libertarian primary

Candidates 
 Michael A. Clem
 Agnes Marie Regier

Results

Democratic primary

Candidates 
 Don McCorkell
 Jim Boren, former chief of staff to Senator Ralph Yarborough
 David Louis Annanders

Results

Results

See also 
 1996 United States Senate elections

References 

Oklahoma
1996
1996 Oklahoma elections